Colchester United Football Club is an English football club based in Colchester, Essex. Formed in 1937 from the remnants of the former Colchester Town football club, United competed in the Southern Football League from their foundation until 1950, when they were elected to the Football League.

Ted Davis, a former Huddersfield Town goalkeeper and Bath City manager was appointed by Colchester United's board of directors to take charge of team affairs in 1937. Davis' Huddersfield contacts allowed the newly-formed club's players to be kitted in the same blue and white strip as his former team. In the 1939–40 season, after only three Southern League games, the Second World War was declared and the club closed down until 1945.

Former Colchester Town player Syd Fieldus along with a couple of the directors kept Colchester United alive but dormant during the war years. Fieldus was appointed secretary-manager for 1945–46. He liaised with Major Dai Rees and forged a strong relationship with the Garrison. Since United had only four contracted players, the team was complemented by a number servicemen. Fieldus urged the board to appoint a full-time manager for the 1946–47 season and Ted Fenton, formerly of West Ham United was hired. Fenton had turned out for Colchester Town in the early 1930s as a teenager. Following a successful FA Cup run in 1947–48, he rejoined West Ham as assistant manager in the summer of 1948.

Ex-England international centre-half Jimmy Allen took over in 1948 and led Colchester to Football League election in the summer of 1950.

Allen resigned on 2 May 1953 and Jack Butler, a former Arsenal player, was appointed his replacement. Butler had been coaching in Belgium and had been in charge of the Belgium national team between 1935 and 1940, leading them to the 1938 FIFA World Cup Finals. He resigned in January 1955 and the board chose Benny Fenton to be player-manager. He spent eight years with the club, suffering relegation for the first time in the clubs history in 1961, only to return to the Third Division at the first attempt. Fenton left to take over at Orient in November 1963.

Fenton's replacement was former Stoke City and England centre-half Neil Franklin. His spell in charge saw Colchester bounce between the Third and Fourth Divisions, and he was sacked following his second relegation to Division Four.

Colchester's new manager was Dick Graham, who adopted a policy of employing older, more experienced players. Graham led his U's side to arguable their most famous victory; a 3–2 FA Cup win against First Division Leeds United in the fifth round in 1971.

When Colchester United held its annual general meeting in September 1972, Graham was so incensed of the questioning of his team and tactics by a shareholder that he tendered his resignation. A month later, Jim Smith was appointed manager, who had led Boston United to the Northern Premier League title. Smith later left to join Second Division side Blackburn Rovers in the summer of 1975. His coach Bobby Roberts was appointed manager.

Under Roberts' stewardship, Colchester were relegated from the Third Division in his first season in charge, but made another immediate return the following season. Following another relegation in 1981, and a drop in form in the Fourth Division, Roberts was asked to resign in April 1982. He refused and was sacked a month later.

Former Ipswich Town centre-half Allan Hunter accepted a player-manager role and introduced former Ipswich coach Cyril Lea as his assistant for 1982–83. On the back of having to give up his own playing career through injury and Colchester player John Lyons' suicide, Hunter resigned in January 1983. Lea took over until the end of the campaign. Four months after becoming caretaker, Lea was appointed full-time. After failing to achieve promotion from the Fourth Division in 1986, Lea was then sacked.

Former Colchester goalkeeper Mike Walker, then coach of the U's reserves, took over as caretaker and went unbeaten in the remaining eight matches of the season. He was appointed full-time, but was sacked in November 1987 by chairman Jonathan Crisp with the club top of Division Four. Crisp claimed Walker had resigned, but an alleged personal matter between the pair was said to have been the spark. Roger Brown took over the team, but his tenure lasted less than a year as he was sacked after Leyton Orient beat Brown's team 8–0.

Former Rangers manager Jock Wallace was tasked with keeping Colchester in the Football League as they finished in 22nd position in 1989, eight points clear of relegation to the Conference. Ill health meant that Wallace had to step down from his role the following season, and former Ipswich and England defender Mick Mills was made the new manager in January 1990. A poor run of form towards the end of the season condemned Colchester to relegation out of the Football League for the first time in 40 years.

Ian Atkins was appointed as the new manager and charged to make an immediate return to the Football League. The U's were playing as a fully professional team, yet finished runners-up to Barnet. Atkins joined Birmingham City as coach at the end of the season and new chairman James Bowdidge appointed Roy McDonough as player-manager. McDonough, who had been Atkins' assistant, led Colchester back to the League football at his first and the club's second attempt, winning the FA Trophy in the process to complete a non-league double.

Following a disappointing 1993–94 season, McDonough was sacked and former Ipswich full-back George Burley was appointed his replacement in July 1994. Burley was later tapped up by Ipswich, who had been refused permission to speak to him and he walked out on fifth-placed Colchester.

Steve Wignall was named as new Colchester manager in January 1995. Under Wignall's management, the U's finished as runners-up in the 1997 Football League Trophy Final and won promotion via the 1998 Football League Third Division play-off Final. Wignall quit in 1999 citing that he had taken his team as far as he could and was frustrated at the role agents were playing in transfer deals he was trying to set up.

Steve Whitton, Wignall's assistant, became caretaker before Mick Wadsworth, former Scarborough manager, was appointed, keeping Whitton on as assistant. Wadsworth later resigned, citing travelling distance to work as his main reason for leaving. Whitton was promoted to become manager in August 1999. After losing to Conference side Chester in the FA Cup at Layer Road and a run of seven games without a win he left by mutual consent in January 2003. Assistant Geraint Williams took caretaker charge, before Reading's player-coach Phil Parkinson as appointed as United's new boss. Under Parkinson, the U's reached the 5th round of the FA Cup and later achieved promotion to the Championship. Parkinson, however, resigned on 13 June 2006 to take over at Hull City.

Geraint Williams was charged with the daunting task of leading United in their first season in the Championship. The 10th-placed finish they achieved in the 2006–07 season was the highest in the club's history making them 30th in the entire Football League. Colchester were relegated back to League One in 2008, and following a poor run, United were in the bottom four with a record of 1 League win from 6, as Williams was relieved of his duties. Assistant manager Kit Symons took charge for four games, but on 10 October 2008 former Wycombe manager Paul Lambert was unveiled as Colchester's new manager. He quickly inspired The U's to record their first home victory in a thumping 5–0 win over Carlisle 15 days later. On the first day of the 2009–10 season, United walloped Norwich in a truly sensational 7–1 thrashing at Carrow Road. Norwich approached the Colchester chairman over taking Lambert as their new manager following their sacking of Bryan Gunn.   Former Watford boss Aidy Boothroyd was unveiled as successor to Lambert on 3 September 2009.

In the summer of 2010, Boothroyd joined Coventry City as their new manager on a three-year deal after he led the U's to eighth place in League One. Colchester promoted John Ward to be new manager following the departure of Boothroyd, having been his assistant. After two mid-table finishes Ward was sacked after a poor start to the 2012–13 Season, being replaced by his assistant Joe Dunne.  Joe Dunne was replaced in 2014 by Tony Humes.

Managers
Statistics are correct as of 25 February 2023.

All first team matches are counted, except wartime matches.

Notes
A. : Steve Whitton was joint caretaker manager with Micky Cook for a single match in January 1999.
B. : John McGreal was joint caretaker manager with Richard Hall in November 2015.

References

Managers
Colchester United F.C. managers
Colchester United